The Champion of Pontresina is a 1934 German-Swiss comedy film directed by Herbert Selpin and starring Sepp Rist, Rudolf Klicks and Eric Helgar.

Production
It is also known by the alternative title of Love in St. Moritz. The film's sets were designed by the art directors Robert A. Dietrich and Bruno Lutz. It was made by Terra Film and shot on location in Switzerland, and at Terra's Marienfelde Studios in Berlin.

Cast
 Sepp Rist as Uli Boeker, Mannschaftsführer
 Vivigenz Eickstedt as Tielko
 Eric Helgar as Moritz
 Rudolf Klicks as Max
 Ludwig Gerner as Karl
 Anni Markart as Violett Moore
 Friedrich Ettel as Friedrich Holz, Industrieller
 Georg H. Schnell as I.P. Moore, Bankier
 Henry Lorenzen as H.W. Macpherson, Sportsmann
 Ali Ghito as Marlen, Mannschaftsführerin
 Edith Anders as Liess
 Katja Bennefeld as Toni
 Hilde Maria Rapp-Fidelius as Maria
 Walter Rilla as Peter Tonani, Geigenvirtuose
 Hans von Petersdorff as Eiskunstläufer
 Hilda Rückert as Eiskunstläuferin
 Hans Albin as Mitglied der Ski-Mannschaft
 Hedi Heising as Ursula Holm
 Erna Fentsch as Bertchen

References

Bibliography 
 Clarke, David B. & Doel, Marcus A. Moving Pictures/Stopping Places: Hotels and Motels on Film. Lexington Books, 2009.

External links 
 

1934 films
Swiss comedy films
German comedy films
1934 comedy films
1930s German-language films
Films directed by Herbert Selpin
Films set in Switzerland
Films set in the Alps
Films shot in Switzerland
Skiing films
Terra Film films
German black-and-white films
Swiss black-and-white films
1930s German films
Films shot at Terra Studios